Saydrel Jude Lewis (born 27 November 1997) is a Grenadian professional footballer who plays as a forward for Honduran club Real Juventud and the Grenada national team.

Club career

Nejmeh 
On 23 January 2019, Nejmeh announced the signing of Saydrel Lewis. On 2 February 2019, he scored his first goal for the club against Safa in the Lebanese Premier League, ending the match in a 1–0 win. However, due to falling into a disagreement with the manager, the club decided to release Lewis on 1 March 2019.

Real Juventud

In August 2019, Lewis joined Honduran side Real Juventud.

International career
Lewis marked his international debut with an 89th-minute goal, his side's second of a 2–2 friendly draw with Trinidad and Tobago, having replaced Denron Daniel in the 84th minute.

Career statistics

International

International goals
Scores and results list Grenada's goal tally first.

References

External links
 
 
 Saydrel Lewis at Caribbean Football Database

1997 births
Living people
Association football forwards
Grenadian footballers
Grenada international footballers
Grenadian expatriate footballers
Expatriate footballers in Trinidad and Tobago
Expatriate footballers in Lebanon
Expatriate footballers in Honduras
Grenadian expatriate sportspeople in Honduras
Grenadian expatriate sportspeople in Trinidad and Tobago
TT Pro League players
Morvant Caledonia United players
Lebanese Premier League players
Nejmeh SC players
Honduran Liga Nacional de Ascenso players
2021 CONCACAF Gold Cup players